This lists 100 Important Tangible Folk Cultural Properties in the category "".

Selection Criteria
Important Tangible Folk Cultural Properties are designated based on the following criteria:

Categories
Necessities of life: clothes, accessories, eating and drinking tools, household furnishings and other residential items
Manufacture, livelihood: farming implements, fishing and hunting gear, artisan tools, spinning and weaving equipment, other items related to work
Traffic, transportation, communication: means of transport, boats, express messenger implements and other items related to barriers
Trade, commerce: calculation and measurement tools, signs, licenses, and other shop related items
Social life: gift exchange, implements for guards and judgements, boarding houses
Religious faith: ritual implements, implements for Buddhist mass, votive offerings, idols, magic implements, and other items associated with shrines
Knowledge of folk customs: calendars, implements for fortune telling, medical tools, and other items related to institutional education
Folk entertainment, amusement, games: costumes, implements, musical instruments, masks, dolls, toys, and other items related to the stage
Related to the life of people: upbringing, important celebrations in family relationships, maternity rooms
Annual functions or events: implements for the Japanese New Year, seasonal festivals or the Bon Festival

Criteria
Materials from any of the above categories are then judged based on whether they exemplify:
historical change
a characteristic typical for the period
a regional characteristic
a characteristic of the level of life
a functional aspect

Designated cultural properties

Footnotes

References
General

Notes

Japanese culture
Japanese folk art
Important Tangible Folk Cultural Properties